Gerwald Claus-Brunner (19 May 1972 – 19 September 2016) was a German politician and member of the Pirate Party Berlin, which is a branch of the national Pirate Party.  He entered the state parliament of Berlin when the Pirate party won 15 seats in the 2011 Berlin state election.

Death
Claus-Brunner was found dead on 19 September 2016 along with a 29-year-old man Jan Mirko L.  in an apparent murder suicide.

The autopsy came to the result that Claus-Brunner had committed suicide and that the 29-year-old man had been killed days earlier. On 21 September, a parcel service gave an undeliverable parcel to the police; Claus-Brunner had sent it to a former longtime companion. The parcel contained a letter in which Brunner confessed to having killed the man. Brunner had been in love with him; Brunner's final Twitter tweet was a photo of that man.

References

External links

1972 births
2016 deaths
Members of the Abgeordnetenhaus of Berlin
Pirate Party Germany politicians
German LGBT rights activists
LGBT legislators in Germany
Bisexual men
Bisexual politicians
21st-century German politicians
German politicians who committed suicide